The 1979–80 FIBA European Champions Cup was the 23rd season of the European top-tier level professional basketball club competition FIBA European Champions Cup (now called EuroLeague). The Final was held at the Deutschlandhalle, in West Berlin, on March 27, 1980. Real Madrid defeated Maccabi Elite Tel Aviv, by a result of 89–95.

Competition system

 22 teams (European national domestic league champions, plus the then current title holders), playing in a tournament system, entered a Quarterfinals group stage, divided into six groups that played a round-robin. The final standing was based on individual wins and defeats. In the case of a tie between two or more teams after the group stage, the following criteria were used to decide the final classification: 1) number of wins in one-to-one games between the teams; 2) basket average between the teams; 3) general basket average within the group
 The 6 group winners of the Quarterfinals group stage advanced to the Semifinals group stage, which was played as a single group under the same round-robin rules.
 The group winner and the runner-up of the Semifinals group stage qualified for the final, which was played at a predetermined venue.

Quarterfinals group stage

Semifinals group stage

Final
March 27, Deutschlandhalle, West Berlin

|}

Awards

FIBA European Champions Cup Finals Top Scorer
 Earl Williams ( Maccabi Elite Tel Aviv)

References

External links
1979–80 FIBA European Champions Cup
 1979–80 FIBA European Champions Cup
 Champions Cup 1979–80 Line-ups and Stats
 Copa De Europa Baloncesto 1980 Final Real Madrid-Maccabi 

EuroLeague seasons
FIBA